Octane Fitness, LLC v. ICON Health & Fitness, Inc., 572 U.S. 545 (2014), is one of two U.S. Supreme Court decisions issued on April 29, 2014 regarding patent lawsuit fee-shifting (the other case being Highmark v. Allcare Health). The Supreme Court essentially made it easier for courts to make the loser pay for all attorney costs if the lawsuit is regarded as frivolous. In other words, "the Supreme Court's decision grants judges more leeway to crack down on baseless claims." 

The decision is particularly relevant for the so-called patent trolls, which "will have to add a new variable to their calculations before pursuing a marginal lawsuit over their intellectual property: the other side’s legal fees." The decision was unanimous, with the opinion written by Justice Sonia Sotomayor.

Background
In the underlying litigation, ICON Health & Fitness, the world's largest maker of exercise equipment, sued Octane Fitness, a relatively small and specialized maker of elliptical trainers, for patent infringement. Octane Fitness, arguing that their elliptical products did not infringe ICON's patent, won on summary judgment and later moved for reimbursement for their attorney's fees.  The district court denied the motion for attorney's fees, stating that even though Octane Fitness eventually prevailed, ICON's claims were not objectively baseless, but the Supreme Court reversed this decision.

See also
 Fogerty v. Fantasy, Inc. (1994): awarding attorney's fees in a copyright case
 Peter v. NantKwest, Inc. (2019): awarding attorney's fees in a patent case
 List of United States Supreme Court cases, volume 572

References

External links
 

United States Supreme Court cases
2014 in United States case law
United States Supreme Court cases of the Roberts Court
United States patent case law
Legal costs